Rooster flag may refer to:

 Cock flag, the flag of the Hindu god Kartikeya
 Flag of Wallonia, sub-national flag in Belgium which depicts a red rooster